Frank Darío Kudelka (born 12 May 1961) is an Argentine football manager, currently in charge of Lanús.

Personal life
Born in Argentina, Kudelka is of Czech descent.

References

1961 births
Living people
Argentine football managers
Argentine people of Czech descent
Argentine Primera División managers
Unión de Santa Fe managers
Club Atlético Patronato managers
Boca Unidos managers
Instituto managers
Club Atlético Huracán managers
Talleres de Córdoba managers
Newell's Old Boys managers
Universidad de Chile managers
Club Atlético Lanús managers
Argentine expatriate football managers
Argentine expatriate sportspeople in Chile